Sekirani (Macedonian Cyrillic: Секирани) is a village  away from Bitola, which is the second-largest city in North Macedonia. It used to be part of the former municipality of Kukurečani.

Demographics
According to the 2002 census, the village had a total of 114 inhabitants. Ethnic groups in the village include:

Macedonians 114

References

Villages in Bitola Municipality